Kenneth Read (born June 24, 1961) is an American yachtsman who is considered one of the world's most accomplished and celebrated sailors. He was named United States Rolex Yachtsman of the Year twice (1985 and 1995), and has won more than 40 world, North American, and national championships in a variety of classes, with nine of those being World Championships titles  in the J/24, Etchells 22 and yacht classes.

College 
While sailing at Boston University (Boston, MA. USA), Read was a three-time collegiate All American (1981, 1982 and 1983) and is now a member of the Boston University Hall of Fame. He won the 1982 ICSA Coed Dinghy National Championship and the ICSA Match Racing National Championship, receiving the "Everett B. Morris Trophy", awarded to the ICSA College Sailor of the Year.

America's Cup 
Read was helmsman aboard two (2000, 2003) of Dennis Conner's Stars & Stripes America's Cup campaigns. He also served as strategist and coach with America's Cup entry Young America in 1995.

Volvo Ocean Race 
Read first began racing offshore when he joined the Ericsson Racing Team for the last four legs of the 2005–2006 Volvo Ocean Race.

Read was skipper of Puma Ocean Racing Team's il Mostro in the 2008–2009 Volvo Ocean Race—his first complete circumnavigation. Read took a sabbatical from his job as vice president of sailmaking company North Sails to skipper PUMA Ocean Racing's entry in the race.

On October 29, 2011, Read returned as skipper for a second time to lead PUMA Ocean Racing powered by Berg's entry Mar Mostro in the 2011–2012 Volvo Ocean Race.

In July 2012, Mar Mostro finished its circumnavigation in Galway, Ireland in third place, securing a third place overall victory in the 2011–12 edition of the Volvo Ocean Race. Alongside a third place podium finish, Read led PUMA Ocean Racing powered by BERG to a first place overall victory in the In-Port Series. Read stated the 2011–12 Volvo Ocean Race would be his last.

Since completing his Volvo Ocean Race campaigns, Read has often acted as skipper for Dr. James H. Clark's latest yachts Hanuman and IRC supermaxi Comanche. In 2015, Read skippered Comanche to Victory in the 2015 Sydney to Hobart Yacht Race. Read is a commentator on the America's Cup tournament.

Read worked as a sailmaker at North Sails since 1996 and has taken four sabbaticals to take part in yacht racing events. In 2012 he took over as president of North Sails.

References

External links

 

1961 births
Living people
American male sailors (sport)
Boston University Terriers sailors
ICSA College Sailor of the Year
J/24 class world champions
Sailmakers
US Sailor of the Year
Volvo Ocean Race sailors
2000 America's Cup sailors
2003 America's Cup sailors
1995 America's Cup sailors
World champions in sailing for the United States